Two of a Kind is the sixth collaborative studio album by Porter Wagoner and Dolly Parton. It was released on February 8, 1971, by RCA Victor. The album was produced by Bob Ferguson. It peaked at number 13 on the Billboard Top Country Albums chart and number 142 on the Billboard 200 chart. No singles were released from the album, but "Oh, the Pain of Loving You" was included as the B-side of the 1971 single "The Right Combination".

Content
"Curse of the Wild Weed Flower" is of note for being an anti-marijuana song, one of the few country songs of the period to discuss drugs. While no singles were released from the album, "Oh, the Pain of Loving You" was included as the B-side of the 1971 single "The Right Combination", with "Oh" being dropped from the song's title. Parton would later re-recorded the song under this abbreviated title with Linda Ronstadt and Emmylou Harris as part of their 1987 album Trio. The song's title was further abbreviated to "Pain of Lovin' You" when it was recorded by The Grascals (featuring Parton) in 2011 for their album Country Classics with a Bluegrass Spin. The album's liner notes were written by Don Howser, longtime announcer on The Porter Wagoner Show.

Critical reception

The review published in the February 20, 1971 issue of Billboard said, "The highly successful country duo comes up with another LP destined for top programming and sales, and should soon be riding at the top of the charts. They turned in first-rate performances of "Two of a Kind", The Fighting Kind", "Oh, the Pain of Loving You" and "Curse of the Wild Weed Flower", among others."

Cashbox published a review in the issue dated February 13, which said, "Having already won just about every award possible for a vocal duo, Porter Wagoner and Dolly Parton, certainly "Two of a Kind", are back on the right track again with their first LP release of the new year. Porter and Dolly are capable of delivering soft, moody ballads, or up-tempo rockers with the utmost of sincerity and smoothness. Among the more outstanding tracks are "Oh, the Pain of Loving You", "Is It Real", "Today, Tomorrow and Forever", and the title track, "Two of a Kind", but the entire album is a classic and will be one of their biggest ever."

Commercial performance
The album peaked at number 13 on the Billboard Top Country Albums chart and number 142 on the Billboard 200.

Reissues
The album was reissued on CD in 2008 with 1969's Always, Always. It was released as a digital download on November 2, 2010. The album was included in the 2014 box set Just Between You and Me: The Complete Recordings, 1967–1976.

Recording
Recording sessions for the album began at RCA Studio B in Nashville, Tennessee, on December 2, 1970. Three additional sessions followed on December 8, 9 and 14. "There'll Be Love" was recorded on May 6 during a session for 1970's Once More.

Track listing

Personnel
Adapted from the album liner notes and RCA recording session records.

Joseph Babcock – background vocals
Glenn Baxter – trumpet
Jerry Carrigan – drums
Pete Drake – steel
Bobby Dyson – bass
Dolores Edgin – background vocals
Bob Ferguson – producer
Johnny Gimble – fiddle
Don Howser – liner notes
Dave Kirby – guitar
Les Leverett – cover photo
Mack Magaha – fiddle, mandolin
George McCormick – rhythm guitar
Al Pachucki – recording engineer
June Evelyn Page – background vocals
Dolly Parton – lead vocals
Hargus Robbins – piano
Dale Sellers – guitar
Donald Sheffield – trumpet
Roy Shockley – recording technician
Jerry Smith – piano
Buddy Spicher – fiddle
Buck Trent – banjo
Porter Wagoner – lead vocals

Charts

Release history

References

Dolly Parton albums
Porter Wagoner albums
1971 albums
Albums produced by Bob Ferguson (music)
Vocal duet albums
RCA Records albums